Fogars may refer to:

Fogars de Montclús, municipality in the comarca of Vallès Oriental
Fogars de la Selva, municipality in the comarca of Selva